Yvonne Meusburger Garamszegi (née Meusburger, born 3 October 1983) is an Austrian retired tennis player.

Meusburger won one singles title on the WTA Tour, as well as fifteen singles and nine doubles titles on the ITF Circuit in her career. On 31 March 2014, she reached her highest singles ranking of world No. 37. On 30 August 2010, she peaked at No. 104 in the doubles rankings.

Playing for Austria in Fed Cup, Meusburger has accumulated a win–loss record of 8–21.

After getting married, she changed her surname to Meusburger Garamszegi.

Tennis career
Meusburger made the second round of the 2010 Australian Open, French Open, and US Open. She lost to Russian Maria Kirilenko on all three occasions.

In June 2013, Meusburger entered the qualifying tournament of the Wimbledon Championships, defeating Nicole Gibbs, Tamarine Tanasugarn, and Sesil Karatantcheva for a spot in the main draw. She was drawn against fourth seed Agnieszka Radwańska and was knocked out in straight sets. Despite the loss, it was Meusburger's first Grand Slam appearance in nearly three years. The following month, she advanced to the final of the Budapest Grand Prix, beating three seeded players en route. However, she lost in the final to third seed Simona Halep in three sets. Meusburger consequently re-entered the top 100 and overtook Tamira Paszek to become Austria's top-ranked women's player.

In July 2013, she won her first WTA singles title in Bad Gastein, defeating Andrea Hlaváčková. This win, along with a successful end to the 2013 season, meant that, at the age of 30, Meusburger's ranking moved into the world's top 50 for the first time in her career.

Ranked 49 in the world, Meusburger reached the third round of a Grand Slam tournament for the first time in her career at the 2014 Australian Open. En route, she defeated Chanelle Scheepers and 33rd seed Bojana Jovanovski. In the third round, she was defeated by second seed Victoria Azarenka.

Logging quarterfinal appearances in Katowice and Marrakech, Meusburger entered the 2014 French Open with confidence, recording a three-set win over French wildcard Amandine Hesse in the first round. She would progress no further; however, as she was eliminated by 2010 finalist Samantha Stosur in their second round encounter.

Meusburger continued her resurgence at the 2014 Wimbledon Championships. Having defeated Vania King at the first hurdle, she advanced to the second round but was defeated there by Li Na.

Meusburger returned to defend her title at the 2014 Gastein Ladies and started off well when she defeated qualifier Tereza Smitková in a match lasting nearly three hours. However, she was unable to follow the win up and was beaten in the second round by Chanelle Scheepers of South Africa. It was Meusburger's least successful performance ever in Bad Gastein, as she had reached the quarterfinals or better of the tournament since its debut in 2007.

Meusburger played her last professional match at the 2014 US Open, announcing her retirement following a first-round loss to Karolína Plíšková of the Czech Republic.

In December 2014, Meusburger announced that she would come out of retirement to play one more tournament—the 2015 Australian Open—telling the Austria Press Agency that she wanted to end her career at the tournament because it was the first Grand Slam she contested was the 2006 Australian Open.

Meusburger played her final career-match against 29th seed Australian Casey Dellacqua at the following 2015 Australian Open. She lost 4–6, 0–6.

Playing style
Meusburger is fit and an excellent mover, often outlasting her opponents during matches. She uses her compact groundstrokes to consistently hit flat groundstrokes and positions the ball well. Her weak serve has been a major hindrance throughout her career, especially against top players, whom are able to attack her serve and place her in a defensive position. However, Meusburger is an excellent returner, winning the most points for first-serve returns during the 2013 season; she was also in the top 10 for second-serve returns and return games won. Meusburger has enjoyed her greatest success on clay courts, having reached three WTA finals on this particular surface.

Grand Slam performance timelines

Singles

Doubles

WTA career finals

Singles: 3 (1 title, 2 runner-ups)

ITF Circuit finals

Singles: 26 (15 titles, 11 runner-ups)

Doubles: 17 (9 titles, 8 runner-ups)

Notes

References

External links
 
 

1983 births
Living people
Austrian female tennis players
People from Dornbirn
Sportspeople from Vorarlberg